Isla Ángel de la Guarda, (Guardian Angel Island) also called Archangel Island, is a large island in the Gulf of California (Sea of Cortez) east of Bahía de los Ángeles in northwestern Mexico, separated from the Baja California Peninsula by the Canal de Ballenas (Whales Channel). It is the second largest of the eleven 
Midriff Islands or Islas Grandes.  It is part of the state of Baja California, located northwest of Tiburón Island. It is a biological reserve called Isla Angel de la Guarda National Park. The island is part of the Mexicali municipality.

The geologically active Ballenas Fault runs along the seabed of the linear Canal de Ballenas. A 6.9 magnitude earthquake occurred on this fault in 2009.

Geography
The island is extremely dry, with no sources of freshwater other than washes following rainfall. It runs northwest to southeast. The west coast is roughly straight in that direction, but the east coast runs inward near the middle before heading outward until it reaches the island's widest point. The coast then runs south for a while before finally returning to its southeasterly direction.

Much of the island is inaccessible due to mountains at or near the shore, especially on the west coast. There are a few flat areas on the coast at the outlets of washes that were created by sediment. These alluvial fans are mostly on the east coast, but a large one is found on the west coast where the island narrows in the middle. Much of the island's geology is made up of volcanic and alluvial sand deposits.

Biology
Despite its extreme dryness, the island is relatively diverse in plant and animal life. There are many types of birds and reptiles, especially lizards. The Angel Island chuckwalla, Angel Island speckled rattlesnake (Crotalus angelensis), Angel Island mouse (Peromyscus guardia) and Angel de la Guarda woodrat (Neotoma insularis) occur only on the island. The only mammals are bats, rodents, and introduced feral cats. Plants include elephant trees, cacti, grasses, shrubs, succulents, and boojum trees.

See also
History of the west coast of North America

Notes

References
The Columbia Gazetteer of North America
Desert USA

Islands of Mexicali Municipality
Islands of the Gulf of California
Nature reserves in Mexico
Protected areas of Baja California
Uninhabited islands of Mexico
Important Bird Areas of Mexico